Gustavo Ballas (born February 10, 1958) is an Argentine retired super flyweight boxer who fought from 1976 until 1990. He retired with a record of 105 wins (29 KOs), 9 losses and 6 draws.

Ballas fought mainly in Argentina. In 1979 he managed to outpoint future multi champion Santos Benigno Laciar in what is a still remembered fight in Argentina

On September 12, 1981 he became the first ever WBA world super flyweight champion by defeating Sok-Chul Bae by TKO 8 in Estadio Luna Park, Buenos Aires, Argentina. Ballas lost the title on his next fight against Rafael Pedroza in Panama. He was unsuccessful on two other attempts at winning the super flyweight title, one from the WBA and another one for the WBC.

Although he fought as much as 120 times in his career, only 4 of those fights were outside of Argentina, losing all of those fights, 3 of them for a world title.

Ballas has had troubles after boxing with alcoholism and drug addiction. He was jailed once for robbery. After that he started recovering and has taken part of anti-drugs campaigns.

Professional boxing record

{|class="wikitable" style="text-align:center; font-size:95%"
|-
!Result
!Record
!Opponent
!Type
!Round, time
!Date
!Location
!Notes
|-
|Win
|105-9-6
|align=left| José Luis Barrios
|
|
|
|align=left|
|align=left|
|-
|style="background:#abcdef;"|Draw
|104-9-6
|align=left| Raúl Ojeda
|
|
|
|align=left|
|align=left|
|-
|Win
|104-9-5
|align=left| Sergio Andrés Carlevaris
|
|
|
|align=left|
|align=left|
|-
|style="background:#abcdef;"|Draw
|103-9-5
|align=left| Luis Américo Díaz
|
|
|
|align=left|
|align=left|
|-
|Win
|103-9-4
|align=left| Luis Américo Díaz
|
|
|
|align=left|
|align=left|
|-
|Win
|102-9-4
|align=left| José Luis Barrios
|
|
|
|align=left|
|align=left|
|-
|Win
|101-9-4
|align=left| José Luis Barrios
|
|
|
|align=left|
|align=left|
|-
|Win
|100-9-4
|align=left| Luis Américo Díaz
|
|
|
|align=left|
|align=left|
|-
|Win
|99-9-4
|align=left| Raúl Ojeda
|
|
|
|align=left|
|align=left|
|-
|Win
|98-9-4
|align=left| José Luis Barrios
|
|
|
|align=left|
|align=left|
|-
|Loss
|97-9-4
|align=left| Joao Cardoso
|
|
|
|align=left|
|align=left|
|-
|Win
|97-8-4
|align=left| Raúl Ojeda
|
|
|
|align=left|
|align=left|
|-
|Loss
|96-8-4
|align=left| Ignacio Lindor Gorriti
|
|
|
|align=left|
|align=left|
|-
|Win
|96-7-4
|align=left| Raúl Ojeda
|
|
|
|align=left|
|align=left|
|-
|Win
|95-7-4
|align=left| Jesús Antonio Moreno
|
|
|
|align=left|
|align=left|
|-
|Win
|94-7-4
|align=left| Raúl Ojeda
|
|
|
|align=left|
|align=left|
|-
|Win
|93-7-4
|align=left| Ramón Norberto Retamozo
|
|
|
|align=left|
|align=left|
|-
|Win
|92-7-4
|align=left| Héctor Luis Patri
|
|
|
|align=left|
|align=left|
|-
|Win
|91-7-4
|align=left| Ramón Alfredo Carrizo
|
|
|
|align=left|
|align=left|
|-
|Win
|90-7-4
|align=left| Ramón Alfredo Carrizo
|
|
|
|align=left|
|align=left|
|-
|Loss
|89-7-4
|align=left| Sugar Baby Rojas
|
|
|
|align=left|
|align=left|
|-
|Win
|89-6-4
|align=left| José Rufino Narváez
|
|
|
|align=left|
|align=left|
|-
|Loss
|88-6-4
|align=left| Rubén Osvaldo Condori
|
|
|
|align=left|
|align=left|
|-
|Win
|88-5-4
|align=left| Eloy Alca
|
|
|
|align=left|
|align=left|
|-
|Win
|87-5-4
|align=left| José Antonio Badilla
|
|
|
|align=left|
|align=left|
|-
|Win
|86-5-4
|align=left| José Antonio Badilla
|
|
|
|align=left|
|align=left|
|-
|Win
|85-5-4
|align=left| Jaime Miranda
|
|
|
|align=left|
|align=left|
|-
|Win
|84-5-4
|align=left| Rubén Osvaldo Condori
|
|
|
|align=left|
|align=left|
|-
|Win
|83-5-4
|align=left| Paulo Ribeiro
|
|
|
|align=left|
|align=left|
|-
|style="background:#abcdef;"|Draw
|82-5-4
|align=left| Juan Carlos Cortés
|
|
|
|align=left|
|align=left|
|-
|Win
|82-5-3
|align=left| Ramón Horacio Albers
|
|
|
|align=left|
|align=left|
|-
|style="background:#abcdef;"|Draw
|81-5-3
|align=left| Adrián Daniel Román
|
|
|
|align=left|
|align=left|
|-
|Loss
|81-5-2
|align=left| Rubén Osvaldo Condori
|
|
|
|align=left|
|align=left|
|-
|Win
|81-4-2
|align=left| Ramón Horacio Albers
|
|
|
|align=left|
|align=left|
|-
|Win
|80-4-2
|align=left| Patricio Jesús Gil
|
|
|
|align=left|
|align=left|
|-
|Win
|79-4-2
|align=left| Ramón Horacio Albers
|
|
|
|align=left|
|align=left|
|-
|Win
|78-4-2
|align=left| Juan Carlos Cortés
|
|
|
|align=left|
|align=left|
|-
|Loss
|77-4-2
|align=left| Lucio Omar López
|
|
|
|align=left|
|align=left|
|-
|Win
|77-3-2
|align=left| Rubén Osvaldo Condori
|
|
|
|align=left|
|align=left|
|-
|Win
|76-3-2
|align=left| Guillermo Manríquez
|
|
|
|align=left|
|align=left|
|-
|style="background:#abcdef;"|Draw
|75-3-2
|align=left| Juan Carlos Cortés
|
|
|
|align=left|
|align=left|
|-
|Win
|75-3-1
|align=left| Juan Alberto Ivalo
|
|
|
|align=left|
|align=left|
|-
|Win
|74-3-1
|align=left| Luis Adolfo Jerez
|
|
|
|align=left|
|align=left|
|-
|Win
|73-3-1
|align=left| Rodolfo Rodríguez
|
|
|
|align=left|
|align=left|
|-
|Win
|72-3-1
|align=left| José Rufino Narváez
|
|
|
|align=left|
|align=left|
|-
|Win
|71-3-1
|align=left| Félix Ramón Colman
|
|
|
|align=left|
|align=left|
|-
|Win
|70-3-1
|align=left| Juan Carlos Cortés
|
|
|
|align=left|
|align=left|
|-
|Win
|69-3-1
|align=left| Luis Adolfo Gerez
|
|
|
|align=left|
|align=left|
|-
|Win
|68-3-1
|align=left| Juan Alberto Ivalo
|
|
|
|align=left|
|align=left|
|-
|Win
|67-3-1
|align=left| Luis Alberto Ocampo
|
|
|
|align=left|
|align=left|
|-
|Win
|66-3-1
|align=left| Alberto R. Pereyra
|
|
|
|align=left|
|align=left|
|-
|Loss
|65-3-1
|align=left| Juan Carlos Cortés
|
|
|
|align=left|
|align=left|
|-
|Win
|65-2-1
|align=left| Armando Brígido Romero
|
|
|
|align=left|
|align=left|
|-
|Win
|64-2-1
|align=left| Luis Adolfo Gerez
|
|
|
|align=left|
|align=left|
|-
|Win
|63-2-1
|align=left| Roberto Rogelio Condori
|
|
|
|align=left|
|align=left|
|-
|Win
|62-2-1
|align=left| Armando Brígido Romero
|
|
|
|align=left|
|align=left|
|-
|Win
|61-2-1
|align=left| Félix Ramón Colman
|
|
|
|align=left|
|align=left|
|-
|Win
|60-2-1
|align=left| Roberto Rogelio Condori
|
|
|
|align=left|
|align=left|
|-
|Win
|59-2-1
|align=left| Raúl Cuevas
|
|
|
|align=left|
|align=left|
|-
|Win
|58-2-1
|align=left| Adrián Daniel Román
|
|
|
|align=left|
|align=left|
|-
|Loss
|57-2-1
|align=left| Jiro Watanabe
|
|
|
|align=left|
|align=left|
|-
|Win
|57-1-1
|align=left| Rodolfo Rodríguez
|
|
|
|align=left|
|align=left|
|-
|Win
|56-1-1
|align=left| José Froilán Nieva
|
|
|
|align=left|
|align=left|
|-
|Win
|55-1-1
|align=left| José Antonio Gómez
|
|
|
|align=left|
|align=left|
|-
|Win
|54-1-1
|align=left| Héctor Ramón Barreto
|
|
|
|align=left|
|align=left|
|-
|Loss
|53-1-1
|align=left| Rafael Pedroza
|
|
|
|align=left|
|align=left|
|-
|Win
|53-0-1
|align=left| Sok-Chul Bae
|
|
|
|align=left|
|align=left|
|-
|Win
|52-0-1
|align=left| Héctor Ramón Barreto
|
|
|
|align=left|
|align=left|
|-
|Win
|51-0-1
|align=left| Roberto Rogelio Condori
|
|
|
|align=left|
|align=left|
|-
|Win
|50-0-1
|align=left| Héctor Ramón Barreto
|
|
|
|align=left|
|align=left|
|-
|Win
|49-0-1
|align=left| Luis Adolfo Gerez
|
|
|
|align=left|
|align=left|
|-
|Win
|48-0-1
|align=left| Jackal Maruyama
|
|
|
|align=left|
|align=left|
|-
|Win
|47-0-1
|align=left| Félix Ramón Colman
|
|
|
|align=left|
|align=left|
|-
|Win
|46-0-1
|align=left| Jaime Miranda
|
|
|
|align=left|
|align=left|
|-
|Win
|45-0-1
|align=left| Ramón Rodríguez
|
|
|
|align=left|
|align=left|
|-
|Win
|44-0-1
|align=left| Jaime Miranda
|
|
|
|align=left|
|align=left|
|-
|Win
|43-0-1
|align=left| Jorge Vargas
|
|
|
|align=left|
|align=left|
|-
|Win
|42-0-1
|align=left| Ramón Rodríguez
|
|
|
|align=left|
|align=left|
|-
|Win
|41-0-1
|align=left| Alfonso López
|
|
|
|align=left|
|align=left|
|-
|Win
|40-0-1
|align=left| Rafael Pedroza
|
|
|
|align=left|
|align=left|
|-
|Win
|39-0-1
|align=left| Miguel Ángel Lazarte
|
|
|
|align=left|
|align=left|
|-
|Win
|38-0-1
|align=left| Ramón Rodríguez
|
|
|
|align=left|
|align=left|
|-
|Win
|37-0-1
|align=left| Héctor Velázquez
|
|
|
|align=left|
|align=left|
|-
|Win
|36-0-1
|align=left| Ramón Rodríguez
|
|
|
|align=left|
|align=left|
|-
|Win
|35-0-1
|align=left| Jorge Aguilar
|
|
|
|align=left|
|align=left|
|-
|Win
|34-0-1
|align=left| Rodolfo Rodríguez
|
|
|
|align=left|
|align=left|
|-
|Win
|33-0-1
|align=left| Juan Aravena
|
|
|
|align=left|
|align=left|
|-
|Win
|32-0-1
|align=left| Rigoberto Marcano
|
|
|
|align=left|
|align=left|
|-
|Win
|31-0-1
|align=left| José Ricard
|
|
|
|align=left|
|align=left|
|-
|Win
|30-0-1
|align=left| Miguel Ángel Lazarte
|
|
|
|align=left|
|align=left|
|-
|Win
|29-0-1
|align=left| John Meza
|
|
|
|align=left|
|align=left|
|-
|Win
|28-0-1
|align=left| Santos Laciar
|
|
|
|align=left|
|align=left|
|-
|Win
|27-0-1
|align=left| Paulo Ribeiro
|
|
|
|align=left|
|align=left|
|-
|Win
|26-0-1
|align=left| Jose Cardozo
|
|
|
|align=left|
|align=left|
|-
|Win
|25-0-1
|align=left| Hector Velazquez
|
|
|
|align=left|
|align=left|
|-
|style="background:#abcdef;"|Draw
|24-0-1
|align=left| Jose Rufino Narvaez
|
|
|
|align=left|
|align=left|
|-
|Win
|24-0
|align=left| Carlos Huilli
|
|
|
|align=left|
|align=left|
|-
|Win
|23-0
|align=left| Jose Luis Lopez
|
|
|
|align=left|
|align=left|
|-
|Win
|22-0
|align=left| Esteban Apolinario Bustos
|
|
|
|align=left|
|align=left|
|-
|Win
|21-0
|align=left| Miguel Angel Lazarte
|
|
|
|align=left|
|align=left|
|-
|Win
|20-0
|align=left| Angel Lois Fernandez
|
|
|
|align=left|
|align=left|
|-
|Win
|19-0
|align=left| Carlos Ramon Escalante
|
|
|
|align=left|
|align=left|
|-
|Win
|18-0
|align=left| Jose Roque Ibiris
|
|
|
|align=left|
|align=left|
|-
|Win
|17-0
|align=left| Juan Carlos Rios
|
|
|
|align=left|
|align=left|
|-
|Win
|16-0
|align=left| Angel Lois Fernandez
|
|
|
|align=left|
|align=left|
|-
|Win
|15-0
|align=left| Luis Adolfo Gerez
|
|
|
|align=left|
|align=left|
|-
|Win
|14-0
|align=left| Hugo Jose Emer
|
|
|
|align=left|
|align=left|
|-
|Win
|13-0
|align=left| Hector Ramon Barreto
|
|
|
|align=left|
|align=left|
|-
|Win
|12-0
|align=left| Enrique Hector Navarro
|
|
|
|align=left|
|align=left|
|-
|Win
|11-0
|align=left| Reynaldo Romero
|
|
|
|align=left|
|align=left|
|-
|Win
|10-0
|align=left| Manuel Enrique Quinteros
|
|
|
|align=left|
|align=left|
|-
|Win
|9-0
|align=left| Felipe Santiago Rojas
|
|
|
|align=left|
|align=left|
|-
|Win
|8-0
|align=left| Jose Martin Devia
|
|
|
|align=left|
|align=left|
|-
|Win
|7-0
|align=left| Alberto Orlando Martin
|
|
|
|align=left|
|align=left|
|-
|Win
|6-0
|align=left| Hector Hugo Lopez
|
|
|
|align=left|
|align=left|
|-
|Win
|5-0
|align=left| Rodolfo Trujillo
|
|
|
|align=left|
|align=left|
|-
|Win
|4-0
|align=left| Carlos Ramon Baez
|
|
|
|align=left|
|align=left|
|-
|Win
|3-0
|align=left| Manuel Enrique Quinteros
|
|
|
|align=left|
|align=left|
|-
|Win
|2-0
|align=left| Felix Humberto Ruarte
|
|
|
|align=left|
|align=left|
|-
|Win
|1-0
|align=left| Raul Anchagna
|
|
|
|align=left|
|align=left|

See also
List of super-flyweight boxing champions

References

External links

1958 births
Living people
People from Villa María
Sportspeople from Córdoba Province, Argentina
Argentine male boxers
Super-flyweight boxers
World super-flyweight boxing champions
World Boxing Association champions